Tushar Kanti Ghosh (September 21, 1898 – August 29, 1994) was an Indian journalist and writer. For sixty years, until shortly before his death, Ghosh was the editor of the English-language newspaper Amrita Bazar Patrika in Kolkata. He also served as the leader of prominent journalism organizations such as the International Press Institute and the Commonwealth Press Union. Ghosh was known as the "grand old man of Indian journalism" and "the dean of Indian journalism" for his contributions to the country's free press.

Ghosh studied at the Bangabasi College of the University of Calcutta. He replaced his father as editor of the Amrita Bazar Patrika and founded sister newspapers across India, as well as a Bengali-language paper called Jugantar.

Ghosh rose to prominence as a journalist in the Indian independence movement. He was a supporter of Mahatma Gandhi and the non-violence movement. British colonial authorities imprisoned Ghosh in 1935 for an article which attacked the authority of British judges.

According to a possibly apocryphal story, the colonial Governor of Bengal Province once informed Ghosh that while he read Ghosh's paper regularly, its grammar was imperfect and "it does some violence to the English language." Ghosh reportedly replied, "That, Your Excellency, is my contribution to the freedom struggle."

In addition to his work as a journalist, Ghosh wrote fictional novels and children's books. In 1964, he was a recipient of the third-highest civilian honour of India, the Padma Bhushan, for his contributions to literature and education. Ghosh died of heart failure in Kolkata in 1994 after a brief illness.

References

Bangabasi College alumni
University of Calcutta alumni
Hindu School, Kolkata alumni
Recipients of the Padma Bhushan in literature & education
Writers from Kolkata
Indian Hindus
Indian cricket administrators
Presidents of the Cricket Association of Bengal
1898 births
1994 deaths
20th-century Bengalis
Bengali writers
Bengali Hindus
Journalists from West Bengal
Indian journalists
Indian male journalists
20th-century Indian journalists
Indian columnists
Indian writers
20th-century Indian writers
Indian male writers
20th-century Indian male writers
Indian novelists
Indian male novelists
20th-century Indian novelists
Indian children's writers
Indian male non-fiction writers
Indian non-fiction writers
20th-century Indian non-fiction writers
Indian essayists
Indian male essayists
20th-century Indian essayists
Indian folklorists
Indian musicologists
Indian folk-song collectors
Indian independence activists from West Bengal
Indian editors
Indian magazine editors
Indian publishers (people)
20th-century musicologists